Ian Nicholas Hutchinson (born 7 November 1972) is an English football manager and former player.

Playing career
Hutchinson's playing career started with Halifax Town as a trainee. He only played 8 league games for Halifax and went on to several other clubs, including making 5 league appearances for Gillingham, before joining Weymouth where he made 550 appearances in all competitions. He played in the Weymouth midfield for ten years before leaving in 2005.

Managerial career
Hutchinson started his managerial career at Bridport. He was there for 13 months. But on 17 June 2009, it was announced that Hutchinson had decided to leave Bridport along with his assistant Andy Mason. The reason given for their departure was that Andy Tillson, who was due to be the new assistant to Matty Hale at Conference South side Weymouth, had decided to join the coaching staff at Exeter City. Following Mason's departure, Matty Hale contacted Hutchinson and just a couple of days he was revealed as the new assistant manager which he described as a job as "too good to turn down".

On 11 October 2009, he accepted the manager's job at Weymouth following Matty Hale's resignation. Hutchinson then brought in his former Bridport teammate Andy Mason as assistant. On 5 January 2010, Hutchinson and Mason were offered contracts by Weymouth chairman, George Rolls until the end of the 2009–10 Season. However, five days later after a 4–1 home defeat to Chelmsford City, Hutchinson and his assistant Andy Mason were both sacked with immediate effect.

Hutchinson was reappointed as manager on 17 April 2010, and was introduced on the pitch before the home game against Hampton & Richmond. He was for the second time sacked in January 2011 once again by chairman George Rolls.

References

1972 births
Living people
Footballers from Stockton-on-Tees
Footballers from County Durham
English footballers
Association football midfielders
Halifax Town A.F.C. players
Berwick Rangers F.C. players
Whitley Bay F.C. players
Cork City F.C. players
Gillingham F.C. players
Weymouth F.C. players
Tiverton Town F.C. players
Bridport F.C. players
English Football League players
English football managers
Bridport F.C. managers
Weymouth F.C. managers